Pinery Creek is a stream in Washington County in the U.S. state of Missouri. It is a tributary of Little Indian Creek.

The confluence is about 1.5 miles west of Richwoods.

Pinery Creek was so named on account of pine timber along its course.

See also
List of rivers of Missouri

References

Rivers of Washington County, Missouri
Rivers of Missouri